Laâyoune (also) or El Aaiún (Hassaniya Arabic: ,;) is the largest city of the disputed territory of Western Sahara, with a population of 217,732 in 2014. The city is under de facto administration by Morocco. The modern city is thought to have been founded by the Spanish captain Antonio de Oro in 1938. In 1940, Spain designated it as the capital of the Spanish Sahara. Laâyoune is the capital of the Laâyoune-Sakia El Hamra region administered by Morocco, under the supervision of the UN peacekeeping mission MINURSO.

The town is divided in two by the dry river of Saguia el-Hamra. On the south side is the old lower town, constructed by Spanish colonists. A cathedral from that era is still active; its priests serve this city and Dakhla further south.

History
Laâyoune or El Aaiún are respectively the French and Spanish transliterations of one of the possible Romanized Maghrebi Arabic names for the city: Layoun, which means "the springs", in reference to the oases that furnish the town's water supply.

The town was the scene of the Zemla Intifada that occurred on June 17, 1970, that culminated in a massacre, resulting in the deaths ranging from 2 to 11 people.

Climate

Climate change 
A 2019 paper published in PLOS One estimated that under Representative Concentration Pathway 4.5, a "moderate" scenario of climate change where global warming reaches ~ by 2100, the climate of Laayoune in the year 2050 would most closely resemble the current climate of Alexandria.

Demographics
Laayoune has a population of 217,732 and is the largest city in Western Sahara.

Economy and status

The city is a hub for fishing and for phosphate mining in the region. In 2010, the country was negotiating a new fishing agreement with Europe over offshore fishing.

Sport 
The football club of the city is Jeunesse Massira. The club plays in the Moroccan Second Division, the second highest football league in the country. Jeunesse Massira uses Stade Sheikh Mohamed Laghdaf for training and games.

Transport 
Laayoune is served by Hassan I Airport.

Education 
Schools in Laâyoune include a Spanish international school, Colegio Español La Paz, owned by the Spanish government.

Diplomatic missions 
On 18 December 2019, Comoros became the first nation to open a consulate in Laayoune in support of Moroccan claims to Western Sahara. In January 2020, Gabon opened a consulate general in Laayoune. Later on, São Tomé and Príncipe, the Central African Republic, Ivory Coast, Burundi, Eswatini, Zambia, the United Arab Emirates, and Bahrain, also opened consulates in Laayoune.

Gallery

See also

List of cities in Western Sahara

References

External links

Official TV channel
Official radio channel

 
Municipalities of Morocco
Populated places in Laâyoune Province
Populated places in Western Sahara
Capitals in Africa
Regional capitals in Morocco
Provincial capitals in Morocco
Populated places established in 1938
1938 establishments in the Spanish Empire
1938 establishments in Africa